Włodzienin  (German Bladen) is a village in the administrative district of Gmina Branice, within Głubczyce County, Opole Voivodeship, in south-western Poland, close to the Czech border.

References

Villages in Głubczyce County